Marnheim is a municipality in the Donnersbergkreis district, in Rhineland-Palatinate, Germany.

Sights 
 Pfrimm Viaduct

References

Donnersbergkreis